Gary Tomlin is an American soap opera actor, writer, producer and director.

Career
Tomlin's career on daytime serials began in 1973 when he was cast on CBS's Search for Tomorrow as Bruce Carson.  He also made a guest appearance on "The Nightwalker" episode of the Waltons (1976). He later appeared as Morgan Simpson on the NBC soap opera Another World in 1979. Both series were produced in New York City by Procter and Gamble Productions.

Tomlin served as the co-head writer of NBC's Days of Our Lives, which tapes in Los Angeles, from 1980 to 1981. He then returned to New York as the head writer for Another World from 1984 to 1985 (at times sharing the position with others). Tomlin next wrote scripts for the Los Angeles serial Santa Barbara (NBC) from 1987 to 1990.

At the same time, Tomlin directed episodes of Another World from 1987 to 1991, later directing on ABC's One Life to Live from 1992 to 1995.

Tomlin became a producer in New York for All My Children from 1995 to 1996, next rising to Executive Producer for the Los Angeles-based NBC serial Sunset Beach from its debut in 1997 until its cancellation in 1999. He also directed episodes of the series during its run. Following Sunset Beach, Tomlin directed episodes of NBC's new series Passions in Los Angeles from 2000 until he was hired by ABC as the new Executive Producer of One Life To Live in January 2001, replacing Jill Farren Phelps. He also directed episodes of One Life to Live during his stint there.

Tomlin's time at One Life to Live saw the return of 1980s villains Allison Perkins and Mitch Laurence in a storyline creating a secret history for events from 1986 and 1987, as well as a renewal of the on-again, off-again multiple personality storyline of character Victoria Lord, as played by multiple Emmy-winning actress Erika Slezak. The series won its first and only Daytime Emmy Award for Outstanding Drama Series for the 2001–2002 season. In late 2002, ABC announced that it was replacing Tomlin with Frank Valentini.

Tomlin returned to directing Passions in 2003, leaving in December 2007 and replacing Ron Carlivati as head writer of One Life to Live during the 2007–2008 Writers Guild of America strike. 

In April 2012, Tomlin was named co-headwriter with Christopher Whitesell of Days of our Lives.  He was previously co-executive producer, 2008–2011, before being let go from that position.

Positions held
All My Children
Producer (1995–1996)

Another World
Actor: Morgon Simpson (1979)
Associate head writer (1984)
Co-head writer (July 1984 – January 1985)
Head writer (January 1985)
Director (1987–1991)

Days of Our Lives
Head writer (with Michelle Poteet Lisanti; October 20, 1980 – October 20, 1981)
Co-executive producer (hired by Ken Corday; September 17, 2008 – September 2, 2011)
Co-head writer (with Christopher Whitesell; hired by Ken Corday; August 17, 2012 – August 18, 2015)

General Hospital
Director (November 15, 2016 – present)

One Life to Live
Director (1992–1995; 2001–2003)
Executive producer (January 2001 to February 2003)
Script writer (December 2007 – February 2008; May 2008 – 2008)
Head writer (February 15, 2008 – May 1, 2008)

Passions
Director (2000–2001; April 2003 – December 2007)

Santa Barbara
Script Writer (1987–1990)

Search for Tomorrow
Actor: Bruce Carson (#3) (1973–1974)
Head writer (1982–1984; 1985–1986)

Sunset Beach
Executive producer (entire run, 1997–1999)
Director (entire run, 1997–1999)

Texas
Writer

Awards and nominations
Daytime Emmy: Win (2002; Best Drama; One Life To Live)
Daytime Emmy: Nomination (2001; Best Directing; Passions)
Daytime Emmy: Nomination (1995; Best Directing; One Life To Live)
Directors Guild of America: Nomination (2001; One Life To Live)

Head writer history

|-

|-

|-

|-

|-

Executive producing history

|-

Notes and references

External links

American male soap opera actors
American soap opera writers
Living people
Soap opera producers
Year of birth missing (living people)
American male television writers